The 2010 Autobacs Super GT Series  was the eighteenth season of the Japan Automobile Federation Super GT Championship including the All Japan Grand Touring Car Championship (JGTC) era and the sixth season as the Super GT series. It marked as well as the twenty-eighth season of a JAF-sanctioned sports car racing championship dating back to the All Japan Sports Prototype Championship.

In GT300 class, Group GT3 cars are eligible to enter as name of category F.

In both classes, every race was won by a different pairing, with Weider Honda Racing duo Takashi Kogure and Loïc Duval eventually becoming GT500 champions for the first time, giving the Honda HSV-010 GT a championship-winning début season. Defending champions Juichi Wakisaka and André Lotterer finished the season as runners-up, while Toshihiro Kaneishi and Koudai Tsukakoshi finished third. In GT300, Kazuki Hoshino and Masataka Yanagida overhauled an 11-point deficit heading into the final round of the championship to claim the title for Hasemi Motorsport. Their final round win, coupled with finishes or lower than eighth place for Morio Nitta and Shinichi Takagi, and Ryo Orime and Nobuteru Taniguchi, gave them a championship-winning margin of nine points.

Drivers and teams

GT500

GT300

 Goodsmile Racing with COX (#9) announced a mid-season car change that will occur at the fifth round. The Porsche 996 GT3-RSR was retired after the third round.
 Team apr changed the name on one of their cars midway through the season, as a promotion towards the movie adaption of animation series Neon Genesis Evangelion. Thus the #31 car runs under the "Eva Racing" banner since the third round, with the exception of the fourth round due to a copyright issue, with the #74 remaining unchanged.

Car changes

GT500
Honda: Having used the NSX since 1996, Honda replaced the unique MR-layout model with a FMR-layout prototype HSV-010, which has been homologated by the JAF. However, Honda have cancelled their plans to produce a road-going model of the HSV-010.
All three teams united their engine specification to 3.4 L V8 with an FR-layout vehicle which was planned to be done last season (only Lexus have made such changes last season).

GT300
Hasemi Motorsport moved into the class from GT500, competing with a Nissan Fairlady Z.
The JLOC team which previously used a Lamborghini Murciélago, have changed all their cars to Lamborghini Gallardos.
A speed, a new team participating in Super GT, uses an Aston Martin V8 Vantage.
Thunder Asia Racing, which raced in Malaysia last year, became the first team not based in Japan to participate in the full season in Super GT history. They use a Mosler MT900M, and in addition, Melvin Choo, one of the team's drivers, was appointed as the Super GT official negotiator to help bring a race to Singapore in future.
Studie, which used a BMW Z4 in the 2008 and 2009 seasons, had originally planned to participate the series as AS Studie Racing in 2010, but did not participate due to the withdrawal of Advance Step. Advance Step had been a co-partner for Studie over the previous two seasons. However at the end of the season, the teams parted ways and will compete separately in 2011.
Good Smile Racing made their debut in the series after becoming the primary sponsors for Studie under the Hatsune Miku banner in the past two seasons. Team COX, the first Porsche works team in Super GT, would become Good Smile Racing's partner. The team originally planned to use a 2010-specification Porsche 997 GT3-R for the entire season. However, as the car was delivered in late May, the team used a Porsche 996 RSR for the first three races of the season. They will also miss the event in Sepang, to test the new vehicle. Porsche and COX also announced that they are planning to supply at least one more GT3-R to other teams participating in 2011.
RE Amemiya Racing announced it will be the final season of the Mazda RX-7, as after the season ends, the car will be donated to the motor racing museum of Malaysia. They would later announce their withdrawal from the series.
R&D Sport have changed the drivetrain on their Subaru Legacy from AWD to RWD, making AWD cars absent.

Others
The use of a three-way catalytic converter is compulsory for all teams.

Schedule
 The calendar was provisionally announced on September 25, 2009. Autopolis has been removed from the calendar, with no replacement round nor venue added.
 Apart from the eight championship rounds, a non-championship round, originally entitled Super GT and Formula Nippon Sprint Cup 2010, will be held at the conclusion of the season. After the Japan Automobile Federation recognised the race as a "JAF Grand Prix" round, it was renamed as JAF Grand Prix Super GT and Formula Nippon Sprint Cup 2010.
 The 400 km race at Fuji will adopt regulations with two mandatory pit stops, while the knockout qualifying format was used in the first two rounds as well as the Suzuka 700 km of the season.
 The 300 km race at Fuji scheduled to be held on September 12 was cancelled due to the serious damage to Oyama, the town where the circuit is located, caused by the typhoon Malou. This is the first event in Super GT to be cancelled by series organisers, and the first Japanese Grand touring round to be cancelled since Sepang in 2003.

Standings

GT500 Drivers
Scoring system

GT300 Drivers
Scoring system

References

External links
 Super GT official website 

2010
Super GT